Within the field of psychology, Averil Leimon is an author, executive coach, leadership psychologist and was one of the first UK-based psychologists qualified in the academic field of positive psychology. Leimon is the joint editor of The Essential Coaching Series from academic publisher Routledge and is co-author of Essential Business Coaching and Coaching Women to Lead. She is also the co-author of Positive Psychology for Dummies and Performance Coaching for Dummies and the author of 100 lessons on happiness in 100 words or less.

Leimon is also co-founder of business consultancy White Water Group.

Biography 
Leimon gained a M.Phil in Clinical Psychology at the University of Glasgow and a BA (Honours) in Psychology at Strathclyde University. She is a major contributor of psychological insight to television (BBC, CNN), radio (BBC Radio 4 Woman's Hour), newspapers (FT, City A.M) and magazines (Women in Business, Cosmopolitan).  She is also a member of and a speaker for the British Psychological Society.

Selected works 
 Coaching Women to Lead, Routledge (East Sussex, UK), 2011
 100 Lessons on Happiness in 100 words or less, Visual Aid Publishing Ltd (London, UK), 2011
 Essential Business Coaching, Routledge (East Sussex, UK), 2010
 Positive Psychology for Dummies, John Wiley & Sons (West Sussex, UK), 2009
 Performance Coaching for Dummies, John Wiley & Sons (West Sussex, UK), 2008

References

External links 
 

British writers
British women writers
Positive psychologists
British psychologists
Living people
Year of birth missing (living people)